Dil-e-Muztar (The Anxious Heart) is a 2013 Pakistani drama serial about the love triangle story of a young man and two women. The show was well received by the audience and was lauded for the lead performances, after it started airing on Hum TV from 23 February 2013. Directed by Shahzad Kashmiri and written by Aliya Bukhari, the cast includes Imran Abbas Naqvi, Sanam Jung and Sarwat Gilani in leading roles.

Plot 
Sila who lives with her father and step-mother, loves her cousin Adeel. Sila is very close to her aunt (Adeel's mother) which is disliked by her parents. Sila's rejects a proposal to marry her step-mother's  nephew. Eventually, she runs away from her house when her parents try to force her into a marriage. Adeel, brings Sila back home. Sila's father gets Sila married to Adeel the very next day. Adeel and Sila move out after this and start a new life. Adeel treats Sila cold heartedly, but with time Sila wins Adeel over.Sila suddenly falls ill after hearing about her father's demise. Adeel confesses about his love to Sila. Sila eventually gives birth to their son Affan. Adeel loses his job, and struggles to find another.  Sila takes up the job in Ahmer's company to help Adeel. Zoya assures Sila that she will take care of her home and son so that Sila doesn't have to worry. Instead she starts an affair with Adeel and Affan is left alone with Zoya's mother who doesn't bother to check on the crying (and ill) child. Sila heads for home when she sees Adeel and Zoya together. She rushes to home but Affan has died.
Affan's death shatters Sila who blames Adeel for her kid's death and leaves Adeel's house. Sila is back at her parents' house, living with her mother and is ready to accept and inherit her late father's wealth. Sila gives birth to a baby (of Adeel), and she names him Afaan. Sila decides not to tell her only child about his real father. Five years later, Sila is now successfully in charge of her late father's business and expands her business with the help of family friends, Nabeela, Sami and Ahmer, as well as the support of her mother.

Meanwhile, Adeel proposes to Zoya, who accepts. On the other hand, Adeel and Zoya go through a rocky relationship with no children due to Zoya's fertility issues. Adeel's company is acquired by a new management, headed by Ahmer and Sila.  Adeel meets Silas and asks for Affan's custody, but Sila refuses. Meanwhile, Ahmer who hopes to marry Sila, prepares the divorce papers for Sila and Adeel's separation. Sila can't get herself to sign the divorce papers. Zoya visits Sila and apologizes to her. Zoya confesses that it was her who created a rift between Sila and Adeel. Zoya falls on Sila’s feet and begs for forgiveness. She says she has wronged both Sila and Adeel and she can’t turn back the time.

Ahmer, Sila and Afaan  drive to the park together. Sila finds Adeel standing there. Adeel and Sila reconcile.

Cast

Main cast
 Imran Abbas as Adeel, male protagonist
 Sanam Jung as Sila Adeel, female protagonist
 Sarwat Gilani as Zoya, main antagonist

Supporting cast
 Saba Hameed as Sila's mother
 Shakeel as Ahmer's father
 Aijaz Aslam as Ahmer
 Ismat Zaidi as Adeel's mother
 Mohsin Gilani as Sila's father
 Rabia Noreen as Zoya's mother
 Shamim Hilaly as Sila's aunt
 Madiha Rizvi as Nabeela

Broadcast and release 
 All episodes of the show are also available on MX Player app. 
 It was also released on the iflix app as a part of channel's contract with the app but in 2019 all the episodes were pulled off and thus have no longer available.

Awards

Soundtrack

The theme song "Dil e Muztar" was composed by Waqar Ali and sung by Alycia Dias. It was written by Imdad Hussain Imdad.  The lines of the song are frequently used during the course of the show.

References

External links 
 
 Official Website
 Hum TV's official Youtube
 Hum TV's official Dailymotion
 Hum TV's official Video channel
 Serial Based on Novel

Hum TV original programming
Urdu-language television shows
2013 Pakistani television series debuts
Pakistani drama television series
2013 Pakistani television series endings
Zee Zindagi original programming